Snow College is a public community college in Ephraim, Utah. It offers certificates and associate degrees along with bachelor's degrees in music, software engineering, and nursing. Snow College is part of the Utah System of Higher Education.

History
Founded in 1888 by local citizens as Sanpete Stake Academy, the school was later renamed Snow Academy to honor Lorenzo Snow and Erastus Snow, distant cousins who were leaders in the Church of Jesus Christ of Latter-day Saints (LDS Church). The initial school was built entirely with local donations, including “Sunday Eggs” (the proceeds from the sales of all eggs laid on Sunday). It is one of the oldest junior colleges west of the Mississippi. In 1917, the academy era ended and the school became Snow Normal College. In 1922, officials renamed the school Snow Junior College only to change it one year later to Snow College. The college was transferred from the LDS Church to the state of Utah in 1931.

In addition to the main  Ephraim campus, Snow College maintains the  Snow College Richfield Campus  in Richfield, Utah.

The Utah State Board of Regents granted permission in 2016 for Snow College to offer a bachelor's degree in software engineering. Snow College, as of 2018–2019, offers bachelor's degrees in commercial music and software engineering.

Academics 
The college offers associate degrees and certificates. It also offers bachelor's degrees in software engineering and commercial music.

The Horne School of Music has been an accredited member of the National Association of Schools of Music since 1997 and is also an All Steinway School. Snow hosts a number of music camps held annually. In 2012, the Horne School of Music began offering the first baccalaureate program in the history of the college, a Bachelor of Music degree in Commercial Music.

The theatre arts program at Snow College is accredited by the National Association of Schools of Theatre and is affiliated with the Juilliard Drama Division. It regularly produces five major productions each year as well as a student produced season of Black Box productions and a summer program featuring instructors from the Juilliard Drama Division.

Athletics
Snow College athletic teams, known as the Badgers, are consistently highly ranked; its football team went undefeated and won the National Junior College Championship in 1985, with the team inducted into the NJCAA Hall of Fame in 2010, and finished #2 in 2006. Along with football, Snow College participates in women's volleyball, men's and women's soccer, men's and women's basketball, men’s and women’s wrestling, softball, and rodeo.

Notable alumni

 Matt Asiata, professional football player
 Kapri Bibbs, professional football player
 Garett Bolles, professional football player
 Aaron Boone, professional football player
 Josh Burkman, professional MMA fighter
 Land Clark, professional football player referee
 Spencer Cox, current Republican Governor of Utah.
 Kevin Curtis, professional football player
 Mario Fatafehi, professional football player
 Josh Heupel, Heisman Trophy runner-up in 2000 as quarterback at the University of Oklahoma, college football head coach
 Brett Keisel, professional football player
 Star Lotulelei, professional football player
 Deuce Lutui, professional football player
 Bronco Mendenhall, college football coach
 Jackson Vroman, professional basketball player

See also

 J. Elliot Cameron, president from 1956 to 1958
 Michael T. Benson, president from 2001 to 2006
 Scott L. Wyatt, president from 2007 to 2013
 Brad Cook, president from January 2019 to July 2022
 Noyes Building, the administrative building on campus
 Saga of the Sanpitch

References

External links

 
 Official athletics website

 
Community colleges in Utah
Universities and colleges accredited by the Northwest Commission on Colleges and Universities
Buildings and structures in Sanpete County, Utah
Education in Sanpete County, Utah
Tourist attractions in Sanpete County, Utah
NJCAA athletics
Universities and colleges formerly affiliated with the Church of Jesus Christ of Latter-day Saints
1888 establishments in Utah Territory